Patrick Guillou (16 April 1970) is a German-born French former professional footballer who played as a defender.

Guillou had trial spells with Walsall and Hibernian in 1999.

References

External links
 

1970 births
Living people
Association football defenders
French footballers
Bundesliga players
Ligue 2 players
Freiburger FC players
VfL Bochum II players
VfL Bochum players
Stade Rennais F.C. players
LB Châteauroux players
Red Star F.C. players
AS Saint-Étienne players
FC Sochaux-Montbéliard players
FC Rouen players
French people of Breton descent